Mark Anthony Brown (born July 18, 1961) is a former American football linebacker who played nine seasons in the National Football League (NFL) for the Miami Dolphins (1983–1988) and the Detroit Lions (1989–1991).

External links
NFL.com player page

1961 births
Living people
Players of American football from Los Angeles
American football linebackers
Purdue Boilermakers football players
Miami Dolphins players
Detroit Lions players